Vera Gemma is an Italian film actress. She was born in Rome, Italy. Her father was the movie star actor Giuliano Gemma.

Filmography
 Vera (2022)
 The Card Player (2004)
 Scarlet Diva (2000)
 E insieme vivremo tutte le stagioni (1999)
 Cartoni animati (1997)
 Stressati (1997)
 Hardboiled Egg (1997)
 Alliance cherche doigt (1997)
 Ladri di cinema (1996)
 La sindrome di Stendhal (1996)

References

External links
 

Living people
1970 births
Actresses from Rome
Italian film actresses